Trivellona bealsi is a species of small sea snail, a marine gastropod mollusk in the family Triviidae, the false cowries or trivias.

Description
The length of the shell attains 9 mm.

Distribution
This marine specimen occurs off the Philippines.

References

 Fehse D. & Grego J. (2004) Contribution to the knowledge of the Triviidae (Mollusca: Gastropoda). IX. Revision of the genus Trivellona. Berlin and Banska Bystrica. Pubished as a CD in 2004; as a book in 2009.

External links
 Gary Rosenberg and Charles C. Finley, New Species of Triviidae (Mollusca: Gastropoda) from South Africa, Namibia and the Philippines; Proceedings of the Academy of Natural Sciences of Philadelphia, Vol. 151 (Dec. 31, 2001), pp. 23-30

Triviidae
Gastropods described in 2001